Barra del Colorado Airport  is an airport serving the Barra del Colorado Wildlife Refuge in Limón Province, Costa Rica. The airport is on the Colorado River, near the Caribbean coast.

Airlines and destinations
There are currently no scheduled services at the airport.

See also

Transport in Costa Rica
List of airports in Costa Rica

References

External links
OurAirports - Barra del Colorado Airport

Airports in Costa Rica
Buildings and structures in Limón Province